Hayes Township, Nebraska may refer to the following places:

Hayes Township, Custer County, Nebraska
Hayes Township, Kearney County, Nebraska

See also
Hayes Township (disambiguation)

Nebraska township disambiguation pages